Yasho Brahma Shah or Yasobam Shah (dates unknown) was the King  of Kaski and Lamjung. He was the youngest son of Kulamandan Shah Khad. His eldest son succeeded him as King of Lamjung, while his second son ruled over Kaski. His  youngest son, Dravya Shah, established the Kingdom of Gorkha in 1559.

References

External links

Gurkhas
16th-century monarchs in Asia
16th-century Nepalese people